Super Michhua is a 2015 Indian Odia-language film, directed by Ashok Pati and produced by Sarthak Films. It stars Babushan and Jhilik Bhattacharjee in lead roles while Aparajita Mohanty and Minaketan play supporting roles. The movie is a remake of 2005 Tamil movie Priyasakhi. The film released on Raja alongside Gapa Hele bi Sata and Love You Hamesha. The film was a box office success.

Cast 
Babushan
Aparajita Mohanty
Jhilik Bhatacharjee

Soundtrack
 "Kemiti Kahibi Tate"
 "Super Micchua" (Title Song)
 "Kut Kut Dhana Lo"
 "Sunyata Ku Pachare Jebe"
 "Tu Mora Mandira"

References

External links
 Jhilik Bhattacharjee Biography @ EntDiary
 Super Michhua @ Fullodisha
 Babusan starer Odia film Super Michua to hit theatre in Raja Festival Super Michhua

2015 films
2010s Odia-language films
Odia remakes of Tamil films
Films directed by Ashok Pati